Klöckner Pentaplast, also known as “kp” is a manufacturer of plastic packaging products. Headquartered in Luxembourg, with other corporate offices in London UK, Montabaur Germany, and Gordonsville Virginia, USA, kp has a total of 31 facilities in 18 countries, with ca. 5,700 employees worldwide.

With around €2 billion in revenues annually, the global leader in recycled content products and high barrier protective packaging operates 2 divisions: (1) Pharma, Health & Protection and Durables (PHD);

(2) Food Packaging (FP); servicing a wide variety of customers in the food-, pharmaceutical-, medical device- and consumer packaging sectors, as well as films for labels, cards, printing and construction industries.

The company is held by a group of investors led by the financial investor Strategic Value Partners (SVP).

History 
Klöckner Pentaplast was originally founded in 1965 as a subsidiary of Klöckner-Werke AG in Montabaur, Germany in the course of the establishment of the plastics industry in the 1960s. Its first production facility outside Germany was opened in 1979 in Gordonsville, Virginia, United States.

In 1996, Klöckner Pentaplast and Kalle Hartfolien GmbH, a subsidiary of Hoechst AG, formed a joint venture under the name of Kalle Pentaplast GmbH, making rigid plastic films. When Klöckner-Werke AG acquired Höchst AG's share in Kalle Pentaplast in 1998, the company was renamed back to Klöckner Pentaplast.

The company was sold in 2001 to a partnership between Cinven and JP Morgan. In 2007 it was purchased by the Blackstone Group. In June 2012, a group of investors under the leadership of Strategic Value Partners (SVP) acquired Klöckner Pentaplast from Blackstone.

References
1. Company History from official site.

2. SVP becomes new owner of Klöckner Pentaplast

Orange County, Virginia
Plastics companies of Germany
Manufacturing companies established in 1965
1965 establishments in West Germany
German companies established in 1965
Manufacturing companies of Luxembourg